Eugene Myers, pen name E. C. Myers, is an American writer best known as the writer of the 2012 Andre Norton Award-winning Young Adult (YA) science fiction novel Fair Coin, and his 2014 YA hacktivist novel The Silence of Six. Myers is a graduate of the Clarion West Writers Workshop.

Works
Fair Coin (2012)
Quantum Coin (2012)
The Silence of Six (2014)
Against All Silence (2016)
A Thousand Beginnings and Endings (Contributing Writer) (2018)
RWBY: After the Fall (2019)
RWBY: Before the Dawn (2020)
RWBY: Fairy Tales of Remnant (2020)
RWBY: Roman Holiday (2021)

References

External links

1978 births
Living people
21st-century American novelists
American male novelists
American science fiction writers
American writers of young adult literature
21st-century American male writers